Lee Il-hyung is a South Korean film director and screenwriter. Prior to directing his first feature film A Violent Prosecutor (2016), Lee is an assistant director on films, such as The Moonlight of Seoul (2008), My Way (2011) and Kundo: Age of the Rampant (2014), and commercial films.

In 2016, he finally had his own opportunity to direct when he teamed up with the production company Sanai Pictures to make the thriller A Violent Prosecutor, which becomes the highest-grossing South Korean film of 2016, with a  worldwide gross.

Filmography 
The Moonlight of Seoul (2008) - assistant director, script editor
My Way (2011) - assistant director
Kundo: Age of the Rampant (2014) - assistant director, script editor
A Violent Prosecutor (2016) - director, screenwriter
Remember (2022) - director

References

External links 
 
 
 

Year of birth missing (living people)
Living people
South Korean film directors
South Korean screenwriters